In firearms terminology, fluting refers to the removal of material from a cylindrical surface, usually creating grooves. This is most often the barrel of a rifle, though it may also refer to the cylinder of a revolver or the bolt of a bolt action rifle.
In contrast to rifle barrels and revolver cylinders, rifle bolts are normally helically fluted, though helical fluting is sometimes also applied to rifle barrels.

The main purpose of fluting is to reduce weight, and to a lesser extent increase rigidity for a given total weight or increase surface area to make the barrels less susceptible for overheating for a given total weight. However, for a given diameter, while a fluted barrel may cool more quickly, a non-fluted barrel will be stiffer and be able to absorb a larger amount of total heat at the price of additional total weight.

In barrel chamber

In the barrel chamber, fluting refers to gas relief flutes/grooves used to ease the extraction of cartridges. They may also come in annular and helical forms. Notable firearms using fluted chambers are the roller-delayed blowback Heckler & Koch G3 and lever-delayed blowback FAMAS and AA-52.

Roller or lever-delayed blowback arms require that the bolt starts moving while the bullet is still in the barrel and the spent case is fully pressurized. Fluting the end of the chamber allows combustion gasses to float the neck and front of the cartridge case providing pressure equalization between the front outer surface of the cartridge case and its interior. The roller-delayed blowback StG 45(M) assault rifle prototypes proved pressure equalization fluting is desirable, since the breech of roller or lever-delayed blowback arms is opened whilst under very high internal cartridge case pressure that presses a spent (bloated) cartridge casing against the chamber walls which can cause significant problems during the cartridge extraction phase. Using traditionally cut (non-fluted) chambers in the StG 45(M) resulted in separated cartridge case heads during testing.

See also
Squeeze bore
Tapering (firearms)

References

External links

Firearm components